The 2010–11 season of the Frauen-Bundesliga was the 21st season of Germany's premier women's football league. The season started on 15 August 2010 and ended early on 13 March 2011, so that the German national team has time to prepare for the 2011 FIFA Women's World Cup. At the end of the season Turbine Potsdam won their third consecutive championship. Saarbrücken and Herford were relegated.

Changes from 2009–10
For this season, the league runner-up gained direct entry to the UEFA Women's Champions League Round of 32. In the preceding year the runner-up had to start in the qualifying round.

Teams
The teams promoted from last season's 2nd Bundesliga were Bayer 04 Leverkusen as winners of the South division and Herforder SC as winners of the North division.

Managerial changes

Standings

Results

Top scorers 
Conny Pohlers scored six goals in the last two games to overtake the opposition and won the individual scorer award a third time after 2002 and 2006.

References 

2010-11
Ger
1
Women1